Enneanectes atrorus, known commonly as the blackedge triplefin, is a species of triplefin blenny. It occurs in the western Atlantic Ocean from southern Florida  and the Bahamassouth to St. Kitts.  It is absent from the Gulf of Mexico.

References

atrorus
Fish described in 1960